Silvestro de' Gigli, of Lucca, was a medieval Bishop of Worcester, the second of four Italian absentees to hold the see before the Reformation.

He succeeded his uncle, Giovanni de' Gigli, was nominated on 24 December 1498 and consecrated about 6 April 1499. He was implicated but never charged in the 1514 murder by poison of Cardinal and Archbishop of York Christopher Bainbridge. He died on 16 April 1521. The position was then held by Giulio de' Medici, the Cardinal protector of England.

Citations

References

 

Bishops of Worcester
1521 deaths
15th-century Italian Roman Catholic bishops
16th-century English Roman Catholic bishops
15th-century English Roman Catholic bishops
Year of birth unknown